Nintendo Mini Classics are a series of small LCD games licensed by Nintendo since 1998. Most games in the series are reissues of Game & Watch titles, but the series does include titles that were not from the original Game & Watch line, like Spider-Man, Carrera and Yu-Gi-Oh!.

Design
Each Mini Classics unit is designed to look like a small Game Boy. Units typically have a D-pad and three buttons. A large action button is also used for setting the alarm, and two smaller buttons typically marked "Game A" and "Game B" but could also serve different functions depending on the game. A keychain is attached to the top left-hand corner but could be removed. Most units also had a stand on the back. Some games, however, do not have a stand, especially the Dual-screen releases such as Oil Panic and Donkey Kong. Similar to the Game and Watch, the Nintendo Mini Classics units have alarm clock features. Each unit is powered by two 11.6x4.2 mm batteries (AG13/Button Cell/LR44/L1154/386/301/186), which are packaged with the Nintendo Mini Classic.

Games

Game & Watch reissues
 Donkey Kong (Dual-Screen)
 Donkey Kong Jr.
 Fire
 Mario's Cement Factory
 Octopus
 Oil Panic (Dual-Screen) (Europe exclusive)
 Parachute
 Snoopy Tennis
 Super Mario Bros.
 Zelda (Dual-Screen)

Original titles
 Carrera (a racing game branded by the slot car manufacturer Carrera)
 Harry Potter and the Goblet of Fire (Europe exclusive)
 Smurfs (Europe exclusive)
 Soccer
 Spider-Man
 Star Trek: The Next Generation (Single Screen) (Europe exclusive)
 Star Trek: The Next Generation (Dual-Screen) (Europe exclusive)
 Star Trek: TOS Beam me up! (Europe exclusive)
 Sudoku (Europe exclusive)
 Tetris (Europe exclusive)
 UEFA Euro 2008 (Europe exclusive)
 Yu-Gi-Oh!
 Poker (Apparently unreleased)

Colors

Some of the Mini Classics models, particularly the often-reissued Mario and Donkey Kong titles, have undergone several different color changes since the original 1998 releases, mostly due to multiple companies working with Nintendo to make and distribute the titles. Some titles have also been given new color-tinted LCD displays since then. The companies that help distribute them are also responsible for the programming for their versions of the titles, which is why some might sound and behave differently.

Octopus
 Toymax: light blue case (1999)
 Stadlbauer: Translucent blue case (1998, 2014)

Fire
 Toymax: Red case (1999)
 Stadlbauer: Translucent red case (2014)

Donkey Kong Jr.
 Toymax: dark green case (1998)
 MGA: yellow-green case (2000) 
 It's Outrageous: yellow case with color LCD (2007)
 Stadlbauer: yellow-orange case (2014)

Mario's Cement Factory
 Stadlbauer: Translucent Yellow Case with Grey D-Pad (1998) and Blue Case (1998)
 Vivid Imaginations: yellow case (1998)
 Toymax: yellow case (1999)
 MGA: grey case/dark blue case with white D-pad (2000)
 Take 2: transparent yellow case (2002)
 It's Outrageous: dark blue case (2007)
 Marks and Spencer: silver case (2007)
 Stadlbauer: blue case (2014)

Super Mario Bros.
 Stadlbauer: silver case/blue case/smaller pack with green case (1998)
 Toymax: silver case (1998)
 MGA: blue case (2000)
 It's Outrageous: green case with color LCD (2007)
 Stadlbauer: silver case (2014)

The Smurfs
 Take 2: transparent blue-green case (2001)
 Take 2 (?): yellow case (2006)

Snoopy Tennis
 Stadlbauer: white case (2014)

Distributors
Zappies Ltd, exclusive distributor of the Mini Classics in United Kingdom.
Stadlbauer, maker of the Nintendo Mini Classics, and principal distributor of the titles in Europe.
Take-Two Interactive, distributor of the Mini Classics in parts of Europe. The only known distributor of Oil Panic and the games based on Star Trek: The Next Generation.
Toymax, first American distributor of the Mini Classics. The first wave released in 1998 consisted of Super Mario Bros., Donkey Kong Jr., Fire, and Parachute. Octopus and Mario's Cement Factory were issued shortly thereafter in 1999. The packaging and an insert included for the last two games indicate that Snoopy Tennis apparently was also released in that time, but a Toymax-branded version of the game has yet to be discovered.
MGA Entertainment, after the Toymax releases, MGA reissued Super Mario Bros., Donkey Kong Jr., and Mario's Cement Factory in the USA beginning in 2000.
It's Outrageous, current distributor of the Mini Classics in the United States. The company re-reissued Super Mario Bros., Donkey Kong Jr., and Mario's Cement Factory, and introduced several of the newer Mini Classics to America, including Donkey Kong, Zelda, Soccer, Spiderman, and Carrea.
Playtronic, former distributor of Mini Classics in Brazil.
Candide, current distributor of the Mini Classics in Brazil. 5 titles were released, all of them are the It's Outrageous versions. The games are Super Mario Bros, Donkey Kong Jr., Soccer, Mario's Cement Factory, and Carrera.

Sales 
More than 10 Million Nintendo Mini Classics were sold by Stadlbauer.

Notes
The US version of Carrera has both Stadlbauer and It's Outrageous branding. Both companies' logos are on the packaging, and Stadlbauer's is on the unit itself. This is presumably because Carrera was originally designed for the European market (where Stadlbauer, not It's Outrageous, is the main distributor), where 1/32 slot cars (the Carrera company's main product) are much more popular than they are in the United States.

See also

Game & Watch
Game & Watch Gallery

References

External links
Stadlbauer EN, English-translated site for the original distributor (archived)
Stadlbauer DE, original Austrian website for Stadlbauer (archived)
It's Outrageous, official website of the current USA distributor (archived)
Game & Watch, fan site for Game & Watch collectors (archived)

 
Handheld electronic games
Monochrome video game consoles
Nintendo franchises
Nintendo hardware
Video game franchises